Llanrwst ('church or parish of Saint Grwst') is a market town and community on the A470 road and the River Conwy, in Conwy County Borough, Wales, and the historic county of Denbighshire. It developed round the wool trade and became known also for the making of harps and clocks. Today, less than a mile from the edge of Snowdonia, its main pursuit is tourism. Notable buildings include almshouses, two 17th-century chapels, and the Parish Church of St Grwst, which holds a stone coffin of Llywelyn the Great. The 2011 census gave it a population of 3,323.

History
The site of the original church dedicated to St Grwst was Cae Llan in Llanrwst (land now occupied by the Seion Methodist Chapel). The current church of St Grwst is on land which was donated in about 1170 by Rhun ap Nefydd Hardd, a member of the royal family of the Kingdom of Gwynedd, specifically to build a new church so dedicated.

Llanrwst developed around the wool trade, and for a long time the price of wool for the whole of Britain was set here. The growth of the village in the 13th century was considerably aided by an edict by Edward I of England (who built Conwy Castle) prohibiting any Welshman from trading within  of the town of Conwy.

In 1276, Llywelyn ap Gruffudd, Prince of Wales, seized the town, declaring it the Free Borough of Llanrwst independent of the diocese of Llanelwy. This the bishop contested, but the borough kept its freedom for the lifetime of Llywelyn and later through efforts by Aberconwy Abbey, which ripped down banners relating to the bishopric or to Edward I of England. A century later, after the monastery moved to Maenan Abbey, the town had its own coat of arms and flag, the origin of the local motto "Cymru, Lloegr a Llanrwst" (Wales, England and Llanrwst). This motto, a testament to this apparent independence, has now become synonymous with the song of that title by a local band, Y Cyrff. When the Llanrwst Almshouses & Museum Trust closed in 2011, it returned to the community the 12th-century Llanrwst flag, as an emblem central to the town's belief in its independence.

In 1610 Sir John Wynn of Gwydir had the historic Llanrwst Almshouses built to house poor people of the parish. These closed in 1976, but were restored in 1996 with the aid of Heritage Lottery funding, reopening as a museum of local history and community focal point. It held a collection of over 100 items relating largely to the rural Conwy valley, and a number associated with the renowned Llanrwst Bards of the late 19th century. It closed as a museum in 2011, but reopened in 2013 as the new council chamber.

Grade I-listed Pont Fawr, a narrow, three-arched stone bridge said to have been designed by Inigo Jones, was built in 1636 by Sir Richard Wynn (son of Sir John Wynn) of Gwydir Castle. It links the town with Gwydir, a manor house dating from 1492, a 15th-century courthouse known as Tu Hwnt i'r Bont, and a road from nearby Trefriw. North of the village is the site of a house, Plas Madoc, which was the home of Colonel John Higson. A friend of Henry Pochin of Bodnant, Higson developed a garden at Plas Madoc which may have had input from, or been influenced by Henry Ernest Milner. The house has been demolished but the garden remains and is listed at Grade II on the Cadw/ICOMOS Register of Parks and Gardens of Special Historic Interest in Wales.  

In 1947, Llanrwst Town Council allegedly sought in vain for a seat on the United Nations Security Council as an independent state within Wales. This is not confirmed in the United Nations Security Council minutes available online.

Llanrwst hosted the National Eisteddfod in 1951, 1989 and 2019.

Geography
The A470 trunk route between North and South Wales runs through the town, joined by the A548 main road from Rhyl, Prestatyn and Chester. To the south-west is Gwydir Forest. On the hills above is Moel Maelogan wind farm; the power generated by its turbines is fed to the town sub-station.

Governance
Llanrwst was the name of the electoral ward to Gwynedd County Council between 1973 and 1996, electing one county councillor.

Llanrwst now divides into two such wards, Gower and Crwst, each sending a councillor to Conwy County Borough Council. In 2017, Plaid Cymru's Aaron Wynne was elected to the Crwst ward at the age of 20 years, making him Wales's youngest county councillor and Conwy County Borough Council's youngest ever elected member. The town also elects members to Llanrwst Town Council.

Demography
In the 2011 census the town population was put at 3,323, 61 per cent being Welsh speakers. At one time Llanrwst was the Wales's eighth largest town, with a higher population than Cardiff. The change in the town population in the 19th and 20th centuries appears in the chart below.

Transport
Llanrwst has two railway stations, Llanrwst and North Llanrwst, on the Conwy Valley Line, which terminated here before being extended to Betws-y-Coed in 1867 and Blaenau Ffestiniog in 1879. It was originally envisaged that the railway would pass closer to the river, on the site of today's Central Garage. The Victoria Hotel was built opposite the bridge in anticipation of this. Had the line been built on the west bank of the River Conwy, as originally planned, to serve the inland port of Trefriw across the river from Llanrwst, it is unlikely that Llanrwst would have gained its present status.

Education
Ysgol Dyffryn Conwy, previously Llanrwst Grammar School, is a bilingual secondary school with about 790 pupils. According to the latest inspection report by Estyn, it has a GCSE pass rate of 71 per cent (based on five GCSEs, grades A–C), putting the school in equal 24th place, just outside the top 10 per cent of secondary schools in Wales. It is also the second best-performing secondary school in Conwy, behind Eirias High School in Colwyn Bay.

There is a Christian-based youth club in Seion Chapel called Clwb Cyfeillion.

Sport
Llanrwst hosts Llanrwst United FC, with two senior teams. The first plays in the Welsh Alliance League and the reserves in Clwyd League Division 2. The club has a junior section of eight teams, playing in the Aberconwy and Colwyn League. Llanrwst Cricket Club plays in the North Wales Premier Cricket League. Since 2012, there has been an annual half marathon round the town.

Notable people
In birth order:
Evan Owen Allen (1805–1852), Welsh-language journalist and poet, born at Pant-y-llin, near Llanrwst
Peter Thomas, Baron Thomas of Gwydir (1920-2008), Welsh politician, born in Llanrwst, a former Secretary of State for Wales
Mark Roberts (born 1967) of Catatonia and its predecessor Y Cyrff, known for the song Cymru, Lloegr a Llanrwst
Kai Owen (born 1975), actor notable as Rhys Williams in Torchwood
Glyn Wise (born 1988), runner-up as a Big Brother 7 (UK) contestant on television in 2006, attended Ysgol Dyffryn Conwy.
Alex Frew (born 1988), graphic designer, created the Wales brand and Transport for Wales brand identities.
Erin Mai (born 2005 or 2006), Wales's representative at the 2019 edition of the Junior Eurovision Song Contest with "Calon yn Curo (Heart Beating)" after victory at the S4C show Chwilio am Seren

See also
Llanrwst Rural District
Free Borough of Llanrwst

References

External links

A Vision of Britain Through Time
British Listed Buildings
Clwyd Churches
Genuki
Geograph
Office for National Statistics

 
Articles containing video clips
Towns in Conwy County Borough
Former electoral wards of Gwynedd
Registered historic parks and gardens in Conwy County Borough